Friedrich Alpers (25 March 1901 – 3 September 1944) was a German Nazi politician and SS-Obergruppenführer. He was also a Minister of the Free State of Brunswick, and Generalforstmeister (General forest supervisor). Alpers was responsible for numerous political crimes in Brunswick.

Life and career
Born in 1901, Alpers studied law and political science at the Heidelberg University, Ludwig Maximilian University of Munich and University of Greifswald. He became a lawyer in 1929.

NSDAP and SS
In June 1929, Alpers joined the Nazi Party (NSDAP membership number 132,812). In May 1930 he joined the Sturmabteilung (SA). On 1 March 1931 he joined the SS (membership number 6,427). He was an active member in the SS, rising to the rank of Obergruppenführer. Since October 1930, he was Minister of the Brunswick State Parliament. Alpers was twice temporarily suspended from the SS in 1933 following complaints of excessive violence made against him during the Nazi takeover of Brunswick.

Minister of the Free State of Brunswick
After the Nazi seizure of power, Alpers became Finance and Justice Minister of Brunswick on 8 May 1933 (a position in which he served until 1934) under the Ministerpräsident Dietrich Klagges.  Along with Klagges and Friedrich Jeckeln, Alpers was one of the main persons responsible for the Gleichschaltung and persecution of political opponents in the Free State of Brunswick.

Subordinated to Alpers was Klagges "Hilfspolizei" ("Auxiliary Police"). This force was directly answerable to Klagges and consisted of SA, SS and Der Stahlhelm men.

World War II
From 1941, Alpers served as a military officer, being made a battalion commander of paratroops in February 1944. After having been badly wounded in battle near Mons, he died on 3 September 1944, either by suicide or by being shot.

Awards
German Cross in Gold on 9 April 1942 as Hauptmann in the 3.(F)/Aufklärungs-Gruppe 121
Knight's Cross of the Iron Cross on 14 October 1942 as Major and commander of Fernaufklärungs-Gruppe 4

See also
List SS-Obergruppenführer

References

Citations

Bibliography

 
 
 

1901 births
1944 suicides
People from Peine (district)
People from the Duchy of Brunswick
Nazi Party politicians
SS-Obergruppenführer
Sturmabteilung personnel
20th-century Freikorps personnel
Recipients of the Knight's Cross of the Iron Cross
Recipients of the Gold German Cross
Nazis who committed suicide
Burials at Lommel German war cemetery
Suicides in Belgium
Military personnel from Lower Saxony
Nazi war criminals